Michael Arthur Farrell (born 27 April 1933) is a male former British middle-distance runner. He competed in the men's 800 metres at the 1956 Summer Olympics.

He also represented England in the 880 yards race at the 1958 British Empire and Commonwealth Games in Cardiff, Wales.

References

1933 births
Living people
Athletes (track and field) at the 1956 Summer Olympics
British male middle-distance runners
Olympic athletes of Great Britain
Athletes (track and field) at the 1958 British Empire and Commonwealth Games
Commonwealth Games competitors for England